Partridge Lake is a lake in Thunder Bay District in Northwestern Ontario, Canada. It is in the Great Lakes Basin, and is on the Fox River system. There are three inflows: two unnamed, at the northwest, and the Fox River at the northeast. The primary outflow, at the south, is the Fox River, which flows via the Pukaskwa River to Lake Superior.

References

Other map sources:

Lakes of Thunder Bay District